AP-5 complex subunit beta (AP5B1) is a protein that in humans is encoded by the AP5B1 gene.

Function 

The protein encoded by this gene is one of two large subunits of the AP5 adaptor complex. Variants in this gene have not been implicated in any disease but damaging variants in AP5Z1, the gene encoding the other large subunit in this complex, are associated with SPG48, a type of hereditary spastic paraplegia. In addition, damaging variants in the genes encoding two proteins that stably associate with the AP-5 adaptor complex are also associated with forms of hereditary spastic paraplegia - SPG11 with the disease of the same name and ZFYVE26 with SPG15.

GnomAD reports an observed v. expected ratio of predicted Loss-of-Function variants of 0.84 (0.58 - 1.24) for AP5B1.

References